Live in Japan is a live album by American rock band Chicago, released in November 1972. It was recorded over the course of three days at the Osaka Festival Hall on the band's tour in support of Chicago V in 1972.  The group recorded Japanese-language versions of "Lowdown" and "Questions 67 And 68" to coincide with their Japan performances.  They performed both songs in Japanese during their stay, which are documented on this album.

Originally, the album was released as a two-LP set (CBS/Sony SOPJ 31-32XR), and only in Japan. The album was released in the U.S. in 1996 as a two-CD set (CRD-3030) on Chicago's own label, Chicago Records.

1971's Chicago at Carnegie Hall, however, is part of the canon with the numbering for the album being 'IV'.

Sound quality
Many fans and band members alike think the sound quality of this recording is better than 1971's Chicago at Carnegie Hall. Chicago founding member James Pankow was always particularly critical of the Carnegie Hall album saying:

Walter Parazaider noted about the sound quality of Live in Japan:

Re-release
The album was reissued in March 2014 worldwide faithfully replicating the original LP design including a cardboard sleeve, booklet with photos and all the lyrics in very difficult to read small font.

Track listing

Side one
"Dialogue (Part I & II)" (Robert Lamm) 6:55
"A Hit by Varèse" (Lamm) 4:43
"Lowdown (Japanese version)" (Peter Cetera/Danny Seraphine/Osamu Kitayama) 4:14
"State of the Union" (Lamm) 8:14
"Saturday in the Park" (Lamm) 4:19

Side two
"Ballet for a Girl in Buchannon" (James Pankow) 14:05
"Make Me Smile" – 3:17
"So Much to Say, So Much to Give" – 0:59
"Anxiety's Moment" – 1:02
"West Virginia Fantasies" – 1:32
"Colour My World" – 3:22
"To Be Free" – 2:17
"Now More Than Ever" – 1:36
 "Beginnings" (Lamm) 6:36
 "Mississippi Delta City Blues" (Terry Kath) 5:50

Side three
 "A Song for Richard and His Friends" (Lamm) 7:54
 "Does Anybody Really Know What Time It Is? [Free Form Intro]" (Lamm) 6:15
 "Does Anybody Really Know What Time It Is?" (Lamm) 3:53
 "Questions 67 & 68 (Japanese version)" (Lamm/Kazuko Katagiri) 4:51

Side four
 "25 or 6 to 4" (Lamm) 9:14
 "I'm a Man" (Steve Winwood/Jimmy Miller) 10:43
 "Free" (Lamm) 6:29

Personnel
 Peter Cetera: bass, vocals
 Terry Kath: guitar, vocals
 Robert Lamm: keyboards, vocals
 Lee Loughnane: trumpet, percussion, background vocals
 James Pankow: trombone, percussion, background vocals
 Walter Parazaider: woodwinds, percussion, background vocals
 Danny Seraphine: drums

References

Albums produced by James William Guercio
Chicago (band) live albums
1975 live albums
Albums recorded at Festival Hall, Osaka